The Journal of Private Equity is a quarterly peer-reviewed academic journal covering strategies and techniques in private equity and venture capital investing, from seed capital and early state investing to mezzanine investing and later-stage financing. The editor-in-chief is F. John Mathis (Thunderbird School of Global Management).

External links

Finance journals
Publications established in 1997
Quarterly journals
English-language journals